Historism (Italian: storicismo) is a philosophical and historiographical theory, founded in 19th-century Germany (as Historismus) and especially influential in 19th- and 20th-century Europe. In those times there was not a single natural, humanistic or philosophical science that would not reflect, in one way or another, the historical type of thought (cf. comparative historical linguistics etc.). It pronounces the historicity of humanity and its binding to tradition.

Historist historiography rejects historical teleology and bases its explanations of historical phenomena on sympathy and understanding (see Hermeneutics) for the events, acting persons, and historical periods. The historist approach takes to its extreme limits the common observation that human institutions (language, Art, religion, law, State) are subject to perpetual change.

Historism is not to be confused with historicism, nevertheless the English habits of using both words are very similar. (The term historism is sometimes reserved to identify the specific current called Historismus in the tradition of German philosophy and historiography.)

Notable exponents
Notable exponents of historism were primarily the German 19th-century historians Leopold von Ranke and Johann Gustav Droysen, 20th-century historian Friedrich Meinecke, and the philosopher Wilhelm Dilthey. Dilthey was influenced by Ranke. The jurists Friedrich Carl von Savigny and Karl Friedrich Eichhorn were strongly influenced by the ideas of historism and founded the German Historical School of Law. The Italian philosopher, anti-fascist and historian Benedetto Croce and his British colleague Robin George Collingwood were important European exponents of historism in the late 19th and early 20th century. Collingwood was influenced by Dilthey.

Ranke's arguments can be viewed as an antidote to the lawlike and quantitative approaches common in sociology and most other social sciences.

The principle of historism has a universal methodological significance in Marxism. The essence of this principle, in brief, is

Contemporary thought
20th-century German historians promoting some aspects of historism are Ulrich Muhlack, Thomas Nipperdey and Jörn Rüsen.

The Spanish philosopher José Ortega y Gasset was influenced by historism.

Criticism
Because of the power held on the social sciences by logical positivism, historism or historicism is deemed unpopular.

Georg G. Iggers is one of the most important critical authors on historism. His book The German Conception of History: The National Tradition of Historical Thought from Herder to the Present, first published in 1968 (by Wesleyan University Press, Middletown, Ct.) is a "classic” among critiques of historism.

Another critique is presented by the German philosopher Friedrich Nietzsche, whose essay Vom Nutzen und Nachteil der Historie für das Leben (On the Use and Abuse of History for Life, 1874; see The Untimely Meditations) denounces “a malignant historical fever”. Nietzsche contends that the historians of his times, the historists, damaged the powers of human life by relegating it to the past instead of opening it to the future. For this reason, he calls for a return, beyond historism, to humanism.

Karl Popper was one of the most distinguished critics of historicism. He differentiated between both phenomena as follows: The term historicism is used in his influential books The Poverty of Historicism and The Open Society and Its Enemies to describe “an approach to the social sciences which assumes that historical prediction is their primary aim, and which assumes that this aim is attainable by discovering the 'rhythms' or the 'patterns', the 'laws' or the 'trends' that underlie the evolution of history”. Popper wrote with reference to Hegel's theory of history, which he criticized extensively. By historism on the contrary, he means the tendency to regard every argument or idea as completely accounted for by its historical context, as opposed to assessing it by its merits. Historism does not aim for the 'laws' of history, but premises the individuality of each historical situation.

On the basis of Popper's definitions, the historian Stefan Berger proposes as a proper word usage:

See also
Heinrich Rickert
Historical school of economics

Notes

References
 Georg G. Iggers, The German Conception of History: The National Tradition of Historical Thought from Herder to the Present, 2nd rev. edn., Wesleyan University Press, Middletown, Ct., 1983, .
 Stefan Berger, Stefan Berger responds to Ulrich Muhlack. In: Bulletin of the German Historical Institute London, Volume XXIII, No. 1, May 2001, pp. 21–33 (contemporary debate between a historism-critic and a historism-supporting historian).
 Frederick C. Beiser, The German Historicist Tradition, Oxford University Press, 2011.
 Frederick C. Beiser, After Hegel: German Philosophy, 1840-1900, Princeton University Press, 2014.
 Wallace, Edwin R. and Gach, John (eds.), History of Psychiatry and Medical Psychology: With an Epilogue on Psychiatry and the Mind-Body Relation, Springer, 2008.
 Peter Koslowski (ed.), The Discovery of Historicity in German Idealism and Historism, Springer, 2006.

Case studies
Historiography
Philosophy of history